was a town located in Chikujō District, Fukuoka Prefecture, Japan.

As of 2003, the town had an estimated population of 9,448 and a density of 139.68 persons per km². The total area was 67.64 km².

On January 10, 2006, Tsuiki, along with the town of Shiida (also from Chikujō District), was merged to create the town of Chikujō.

See also
Tsuiki Air Field
Tsuiki Station

External links
 Chikujō official website 

Dissolved municipalities of Fukuoka Prefecture
Geography of Fukuoka Prefecture
Populated places disestablished in 2006
2006 disestablishments in Japan